George Edward Barr (born January 30, 1937) is an American science fiction and fantasy artist.

Career
Barr's work shows influences from Arthur Rackham, Hannes Bok and Virgil Finlay. The Encyclopedia of Science Fiction describes him as one of the least appreciated SF/fantasy artists. His work is often romantic and whimsical. His technique involves overlaying pen and ink line work with pastel watercolors.

Barr began his art career in 1960 by contributing artwork to various high-profile science fiction fanzines in fandom and for many years displaying and selling his artwork in the art shows of both regional science fiction conventions and at the annual World Science Fiction Convention.

A collection of his professional fantasy and science fiction paintings, Upon the Winds of Yesterday and Other Explorations, was published by Donald M. Grant, Publisher, Inc. in 1976. The volume debuted at MidAmeriCon, the 34th World Science Fiction Convention, where Barr was the convention's Fan Guest of Honor, along with Robert A. Heinlein, who was the convention's professional writer Guest of Honor. Barr provided the full color wrap around dust jacket for the convention's hardcover program book.

Since then Barr has provided numerous black and white interior illustrations and dozens of full color covers for various professional science fiction magazines and for dozens of science fiction and fantasy book covers. He has also illustrated Dungeons & Dragons role-playing game supplements, including 1987's Dragonlance Adventures, the Dungeon Master's Design Kit, and several books in the Advanced Dungeons & Dragons Adventure Gamebooks line.

Personal life
George Barr was born in Tucson, Arizona, grew up in Salt Lake City, Utah, and later moved to Northern California.

General reference for article

Notes

External links
The Enchanted Thingamajig - official site
Illustrated biography from Bud Plant site
George Barr on DeviantArt
 
 

1937 births
American speculative fiction artists
Artists from Salt Lake City
Artists from Tucson, Arizona
Fantasy artists
Hugo Award-winning artists
Living people
Role-playing game artists
Science fiction artists